Steinhauser, Steinhäuser or Steinhäußer (Steinhaeusser) may refer to:

  (born 1971), Austrian politician
 Carl Johann Steinhäuser (1813–1879), German academic sculptor
 Günther Steinhauser, Italian luger
 Harald Steinhauser, Italian luger
 Jan Steinhauser (born 1944), Dutch rower
 Karl Steinhauser, Austrian political scientist
 Mary Steinhauser (1942–1975), Canadian prison justice advocate
  (born 1941), Austrian geophysicist
 Tobias Steinhauser (born 1972), German cyclist

Steinhäuser 
  (1825–1858), German sculptor, brother of Carl and Wilhelm Steinhäuser
  (1813–1879), German sculptor, brother of Adolph and Wilhelm Steinhäuser
  (died 1903), German organist and Royal Music Director of the St. Marien Church in Mühlhausen/Thüringen
  (1874–1955), Hessian politician
  (1983–2002), mass murderer and perpetrator of the Erfurt school massacre
  (1817–1903), German painter, brother of Adolph and Carl Steinhäuser

Steinhäußer 
  (1731–1811), German politician, Mayor of Durlach
 Fritz Steinhäußer, architect in Augsburg

See also 
 Sieben Steinhäuser, group of five dolmens on the Lüneburg Heath in the NATO training area of Bergen-Hohne, Lower Saxony, Germany
 Steinhaus (disambiguation)
 Steinhausen (disambiguation)

German-language surnames